Oswulf was a medieval Bishop of Ramsbury.

Oswulf was consecrated between 949 and 951. He died in 970. In the 940s Ealdorman Ealhhelm was given the lands of the then defunct Evesham Abbey, and on his death they were appropriated by thegn Wulfric and Bishop Oswulf.

Citations

References

External links
 

Bishops of Ramsbury (ancient)
970 deaths
Year of birth unknown